A harp concerto is a type of musical composition composed for a solo harp player accompanied by a large ensemble, such as a concert band or orchestra.

Notable examples

 Elias Parish Alvars
 Harp Concerto in G minor (Op. 81) (1842) 
 Harp Concerto in E-flat major (Op. 98) (1845)
 Alberto Ginastera
 Harp Concerto (1956)
 Reinhold Glière
 Harp Concerto (1938)
 Patrick Hawes
 Highgrove Suite (2010)
 Jennifer Higdon
 Harp Concerto (2018)
 Wolfgang Amadeus Mozart (1778)
 Concerto for Flute, Harp, and Orchestra
 Walter Piston
 Capriccio for Harp and String Orchestra (1963)
 Henriette Renie
 Harp concerto in C (1900)
 Joaquín Rodrigo
 Concierto serenata (1952)

See also
List of compositions for harp

References